Aleiodes shakirae is a species of parasitic wasp belonging to the family Braconidae. The species is named after Shakira because "parasitism by this species causes the host caterpillar to bend and twist its abdomen in various ways, and Shakira is also famous for her belly-dancing."

See also
 List of organisms named after famous people (born 1950–present)

References

Braconidae
Insects described in 2014
Shakira